Fearless Music was a televised musical showcase broadcast between 2004 and 2010 which featured live performances from up-and-coming acts, primarily from the alternative rock and indie rock circuits. It was filmed at the Crash Mansion rock club in New York City.

The show aired at 12:30am on Saturdays on WNYW Fox 5 and was syndicated in over 200 cities in the United States, 350 college TV stations, and worldwide through Voice of America.

History

The show was founded by its producer and lead host, Jamie Lamm, whose career as a multi-instrumentalist had been inspired by rock documentaries and musical showcase series that aired when he was younger, including The Midnight Special and The Old Grey Whistle Test. The name "fearless" referred to the show taking a chance on musicians that other mainstream media would be afraid to promote. In August 2003, Fearless Music began taping artists in New York City.

The first episode aired on New York's local Time Warner Cable channel on January 18, 2004. Despite high-quality audio, due to the show's low budget, it was filmed using three CCTV home security cameras.

The show moved forward on Fox and its affiliates, airing on more stations beginning April 1, 2006. Studio lights and HD cameras were also installed for an improved look.

On October 12, 2008, the show launched its own YouTube channel, providing clips from band performances on the show, as well as some full episodes.

By the end of 2008, nearly 1,500 bands had appeared on the show; however, the show's parent company, Fearless Music Inc., filed for Chapter 11 bankruptcy to get out of its $100,000 debts.

The show continued for three further seasons until its final broadcast on December 4, 2010. On March 24, 2011, it was announced that Union Square would acquire Fearless Music Television, but no further episodes were made and the acquisition was cancelled on March 24, 2012.

Format

The show consisted of seven bands and one short interview segment. The first six bands were performances recorded in the Crash Mansion rock club in New York City.

Viewers could then vote for their favorite artist at FearlessMusic.com during the following days. The final performance would be from the band that won the previous week's online poll.

Episodes

Season 9

See also
Indie (music)
College rock

References

External links
Official website (archived 2 February 2019)

American non-fiction television series